The 14th Canadian Hussars was a light cavalry and later light armoured reconnaissance regiment of the Non-Permanent Active Militia of the Canadian Militia and later the Canadian Army. First raised in 1910 as the 27th Light Horse, the regiment was Redesignated in 1920 as the 14th Canadian Light Horse and again in 1940 as the 14th Canadian Hussars. On 31 March 1968, the regiment was reduced to nil strength and placed on the Supplementary Order of Battle.

Lineage

14th Canadian Hussars 

 Originated on 1 April 1910, in Swift Current, Saskatchewan, as the 27th Light Horse.
 Redesignated on 15 March 1920, as the 14th Canadian Light Horse.
 Redesignated on 1 August 1940, as the 14th Canadian Hussars.
 Redesignated on 11 February 1941, as the 2nd (Reserve) Regiment, 14th Canadian Hussars.
 Redesignated on 1 April 1941, as the 8th (Reserve) Reconnaissance Battalion, (14th Canadian Hussars).
 Redesignated on 8 June 1942, as the 8th (Reserve) Reconnaissance Regiment, (14th Canadian Hussars), CAC.
 Redesignated on 2 August 1945, as the 8th (Reserve) Reconnaissance Regiment, (14th Canadian Hussars), RCAC.
 Redesignated on 19 June 1947, as the 8th Armoured Car Regiment (14th Canadian Hussars).
 Redesignated on 4 February 1949, as the 14th Canadian Hussars (8th Armoured Car Regiment).
 Redesignated on 31 July 1954, as the 14th Canadian Hussars (8th Armoured Regiment).
 Redesignated on 19 May 1958, as the 14th Canadian Hussars.
 Reduced to Nil Strength on 31 March 1968, and Transferred to the Supplementary Order of Battle.

Perpetuations 

 209th (Swift Current) Battalion, CEF

History

Early History 
On 1 April 1910, the 27th Light Horse was authorized for service. The regiment had its Regimental Headquarters in Swift Current and had Squadrons in Maple Creek and Swift Current, Saskatchewan.

The First World War 
On 6 August 1914, Details of the 27th Light Horse were placed on active service for local protection duties.

On 15 July 1916, the 209th (Swift Current) Battalion, CEF was authorized for service and on 1 November 1916, the battalion embarked for Great Britain. After arrived in the UK, on 5 December 1916, the battalion's personnel were absorbed by the 9th Reserve Battalion, CEF to provide reinforcements for the Canadian Corps in the field. On 21 May 1917, the 209th Battalion, CEF was disbanded.

1920s-1930s 
On 15 March 1920, as a result of the Post-WWI Reorganization of the Canadian Militia following the Otter Commission, the 27th Light Horse was Redesignated as 14th Canadian Light Horse.

The Second World War 
With the outbreak of World War II, the 14th Canadian Light Horse was not mobilized right away for service. On 1 August 1940, the regiment was Redesignated as the 14th Canadian Hussars.

On 26 January 1941, the regiment mobilized the 14th (Active) Canadian Hussars, CASF for active service. On 11 February 1941, the regiment was converted to armour and redesignated as the 8th Reconnaissance Battalion (14th Canadian Hussars), CASF and later on 8 June 1942, as the 8th Reconnaissance Regiment (14th Canadian Hussars), CAC, CASF. Formed from reinforcements from Canada and personnel of the 2nd Canadian Infantry Division in the United Kingdom, the regiment was organized as the Reconnaissance Regiment of the 2nd Canadian Infantry Division. On 7 July 1944, the regiment landed in France along with the rest of the 2nd Canadian Infantry Division, where it fought in North-West Europe until the end of the war. On 2 August 1945, the regiment was Redesignated as the 8th Reconnaissance Regiment (14th Canadian Hussars), RCAC, CASF. On 15 December 1945, the overseas regiment was disbanded.

Post War 
After returning to Canada, the 14th Canadian Hussars resumed their role as an armoured regiment in the Canadian Army Reserve. On 19 June 1947, the regiment was redesignated the 8th Armoured Car Regiment (14th Canadian Hussars) and again on 19 May 1958, as the 14th Canadian Hussars. On 31 March 1965, the regiment's role was converted from that of an armoured regiment to a reconnaissance regiment. On 31 March 1968, as part of the major reorganization of the Canadian Armed Forces at the time, the 14th Canadian Hussars was reduced to nil strength (virtually disbanded) and placed on the Supplementary Order of Battle.

Organization

27th Light Horse (1 April 1910) 

 Regimental Headquarters (Moose Jaw, Saskatchewan)
 A Squadron (Maple Creek, Saskatchewan)
 B Squadron (Swift Current, Saskatchewan)

14th Canadian Light Horse (15 March 1920) 

 Regimental Headquarters (Swift Current, SK)
 HQ Squadron (Shaunavon, SK)
 A Squadron (Maple Creek, SK)
 B Squadron (Swift Current, SK)
 C Squadron (Climax, SK)

14th Canadian Hussars (31 March 1968) 

 Headquarters Squadron (Swift Current)
 A Squadron (maintained a detached troop at Vanguard until 1954) (Swift Current)
 B Squadron (maintained a detached troop at Gull Lake until 1954) (Maple Creek)
 C Squadron (maintained a detached troop at Frontier until 1954) (Shaunavon)

Alliances 

  14th King's Hussars (Until 1922)
  14th/20th The King's Royal Hussars (1922-1965)
  Queen Alexandra's Mounted Rifles

Battle Honours 
The battle honours in small capitals were awarded for participation in large operations and campaigns, while those in lowercase indicate honours granted for more specific battles. Battle honours in bold type are emblazoned on the regimental guidon.

The First World War 

 Ypres, 1915, '17
 Festubert, 1915
 Arras, 1917, '18
 Hill 70
 Amiens
 Hindenburg Line
 Pursuit to Mons

The Second World War 

 Caen
 Falaise
 Falaise Road
 Clair Tizon
 The Laison
 The Seine, 1944
 Antwerp–Turnhout Canal
 The Scheldt
 Woensdrecht
 South Beveland
 The Rhineland
 Twente Canal
 Groningen
 Oldenburg
 North-West Europe, 1944–1945

Notable Members 

 Brigadier-General George Tuxford 
 Captain Bert Lawrence

See also 

 List of regiments of cavalry of the Canadian Militia (1900–1920)

References 

14th Canadian Hussars
Military units and formations of Saskatchewan
Supplementary Order of Battle